Calliotropis coopertorium is a species of sea snail, a marine gastropod mollusc in the family Eucyclidae.

Description
The shell can grow to be 2.8 mm in length.

Distribution
Can be found in Vanuatu and Fiji.

References

 Vilvens C. (2007) New records and new species of Calliotropis from Indo-Pacific. Novapex 8 (Hors Série 5): 1–72.

External links

coopertorium
Gastropods described in 2007